Siccyna is a genus of moths of the family Erebidae. The genus was described by Nye in 1975.

Species
Siccyna reichi (Gaede, 1940) Liberia
Siccyna thisbe (Fawcett, 1918) Kenya

References

Calpinae